Subotivka is a village in Mohyliv-Podilskyi Raion Vinnytsia Oblast of southern Ukraine located near the Dniester river border with Moldova. Subotivka is a town in southern Ukraine located at Lat 48° 19' 44.328"n Longitude27° 59' 33.828" e near the Dniester river border with Moldova.

References

Shtetls
Mohyliv-Podilskyi Raion

Villages in Mohyliv-Podilskyi Raion